Kateřina Sokolová is the Miss of the Czech Republic for 2007, who took over the crown of royal beauty on April 14, 2007, after Taťána Kuchařová. During the gala evening, she received the title of Miss Silhouette and Miss Bohemia. In 2007, she participated in the Miss World competition in China.

She is a co-founder of the AutTalk Charity Fund.

She started modeling at the age of 14 in her hometown Přerov, then she continued with modeling in Prague. She has worked as a model almost all over the world.

She is represented by the prestigious modeling agency Elite model management Prague.

During her career, she has collaborated or become the face of companies such as Triumph, Lavazza, Marina Rinaldi, Jewelry Aurum, AŽD, Botanica Pevonia, Armani Beauty, Colmar, Esthe, Ahlens, Fogs and others. Collaboration with fashion magazines and fashion media, whether fashion or fashion story, such as Elle, Harpers Bazaar, InStyle, Cosmopolitan, Fashion TV, Style, Promo Mag NY, Luxury Guide, Playboy and more.

Collaborating with photographers such as Marc Neuhoff, Marino Parisoto, Perla Maarek, Thomas Louvagny, Holly Parker, Wolfgang Pohn. They also collaborate with leading Czech photographers, such as Matúšh Tóth, David Turecký, Branislav Šimončík, Lukáš Dvořák, Robert Stano, Adolf Zika and Lucie Robinson.

Kateřina Sokolová played one of the main roles in the Czech Chinese series Last Visa by TwinStar film.

She starred in the Chinese youth program Day Day Up, which is one of the most watched Chinese shows with an average viewership of over 100 million viewers.

She has also performed in a number of Czech talk shows.

In May 2008, she graduated from the Modřany Classical Grammar School.

In 2014, she graduated with a degree in economics at the University of Business in Prague in the field of Tourism Management.

Philanthropy

In 2015, Kateřina Sokolová together with her father Jan Sokol founded the AutTalk Foundation based on family experience. The aim of the fund is to support families caring for autism, the fund also focuses on educating the topic of autism and supporting organizations working in the field of autism. Katka's brother Radovan is autistic, which is why the Sokol decided to help families affected by a similar fate.

In 2021, Kateřina Sokolová received the Youth Heroes Award from IAYSP Czech for her work in the field of philanthropy.

References

External links

 sokolova.cz

1989 births
Living people
People from Přerov
Miss World 2007 delegates
Czech beauty pageant winners
Czech female models